Joan Corbella i Roig (1945 – 3 February 2021) was a Spanish psychiatrist and science communicator.

Biography
Corbella promoted the presence of psychiatry in the media, where he became quite popular. He directed the Enciclopedia práctica de la psicología and wrote various books of psychiatry, such as Qui som, què fem, Viure sense por, Ante una edad difícil, La por del silenci, Viure en parella, and Pensar o viure. He also wrote the novel D'avui per demà, which won the Ramon Llull Novel Award in 1997.

Joan Corbella died in Palma de Mallorca on 3 February 2021 at the age of 76, a few days after his birthday.

References

1945 births
2021 deaths
Spanish psychiatrists
Science communicators